Orma or One leaf international film festival is a festival organized by the Kerala Information and Public Relations Department in Thiruvananthapuram, Kerala, India.

Orma 2004
The 2004 dates for the festival were 27 July - 29 July.

The festival was inaugurated by Mr. M.M. Hassan, Minister for Information and Parliamentary Affairs. The renowned poet, lyricist and film maker, Mr. P. Bhaskaran presided over the function.

Films
Orma 2004 showcased the following films:

EMS
Directed by K.S. Ranjith. 
History and biography. Depicts the independence and anti-landlord movements in Kerala. While EMS challenged the Brahmin orthodoxy through the symbolic acts of burning sacred thread, C.J. Thomas, the playwright and one of the original thinkers in Malayalam upturned the Christian orthodoxy through tearing away the sacred dress.

Malayalathinte Priya CJ
Directed by A.V. Thampan.
Portrays the life of an eminent genius of Malayalam, including an interview with his wife Mrs. Rosi Thomas.

K. Kelappan
A documentary directed by Satheesh Poduval.
Depicts the independence movement through the biographical narrative of Kelappan.

Njeralath Rama Poduval – the Fakir
Directed by Satheesh Venganoor.
Depicts the life and legacy of Njeralath Rama Poduval, Malayalam artist and ‘sopanam’ music maestro.

Ayyankali
Directed by Mr. Kannan.
Documentary on the social revolutionary who fought against all forms of social oppression and envisioned the formation of secular modern Kerala.

Vaikkam Abdul Khader
Directed by Mr. K. Satheesh
Biographical documentary on statesman for modern Kerala democracy.

Pattam Thanu Pillai
Directed by Mr. B.S. Ratheesh
Biographical documentary on Pattom A. Thanu Pillai, statesman in Kerala. Depicts the political values of Kerala during the independence movement.

Aravindan
Directed by Mr. K.K. Chandran.
Biographical documentary on the filmmaker, Aravindan.

Sahodaran Ayyappan
Directed by Mr. Majid Gulisthan.
Narrative documentary recreates events in the life of Sahodaran Ayyappan – the great organizer of Sree Narayana Movement.

SK
Directed by Mr. K. Rajgopal. 
Depicts the life and times of S.K. Pottekkad, an eminent Malayalam travelogue writer.

Sri Narayana Guru
Directed by Mr. P. Baburaj, portrays the different facets of Sri
Narayana Guru – spiritual reformer, renaissance
intellectual and social organizer.

Goda Varma Raja
Directed by Ms. Indira and Mr. Ajith.
Documentary biography.

Akkamma Cheriyan
Directed by Ms. Sreebala K. Menon.
Documentary biography.

Pattikkamthodi Ravunni Menon
Directed by Mr. N.P. Gopinath.
Documentary biography.

Vaidyaratnam P.S. Warrier
Directed by Mr. Krishnanunni.
Documentary biography on the great ayurvedic physician of Kerala.

Arnoos Pathiri
Directed by Mr. Ravidran 
Depicts the polyphonic trends of cultural formation of modern Kerala, including the process of secularization through the contributions of non-Malayali writers and intellectuals.

Varna Bhedangal
Directed by Mr. Damodar Prasad.
Depicts the intellectual and creative evolution of one of the greatest Malayalam
painters, K.C.S. Panicker and his contribution to the emergence
of modernist sensibility in art.

External links
 August 2004 Synopsis Brochure (pdf)

Documentary film festivals in India
Film festivals in Kerala
Mass media in Thiruvananthapuram
Festivals in Thiruvananthapuram district